Vsevolod Chentsov (born in 1974) is Ukraine's ambassador to the Netherlands from March 2017. He began working in the Ministry of Foreign Affairs of Ukraine in 1996. He worked in the Ukrainian missions in Turkey and Poland, and the Mission of Ukraine to the European Union. Prior to his appointment as ambassador to the Netherlands, he was the director of the EU department of Ministry of Foreign Affairs of Ukraine.

References

1974 births
Ambassadors of Ukraine to the Netherlands
Living people
University of Lviv alumni